Bembidion scopulinum is a species of ground beetle in the family Carabidae. It is found in Europe and Northern Asia (excluding China), North America, and temperate Asia.

Subspecies
These two subspecies belong to the species Bembidion scopulinum:
 Bembidion scopulinum bellulum Casey
 Bembidion scopulinum scopulinum

References

Further reading

External links

 

scopulinum
Articles created by Qbugbot
Beetles described in 1837